Massachusetts House of Representatives' 5th Plymouth district in the United States is one of 160 legislative districts included in the lower house of the Massachusetts General Court. It covers part of Plymouth County. Republican David DeCoste of Norwell has represented the district since 2015.

Towns represented
The district includes the following localities:
 Hanover
 Norwell
 Rockland

The current district geographic boundary overlaps with those of the Massachusetts Senate's Norfolk and Plymouth district, 2nd Plymouth and Bristol district, and Plymouth and Norfolk district.

Former locales
The district previously covered:
 Duxbury, circa 1872 
 Kingston, circa 1872

Representatives
 William Ellison, circa 1858 
 Job W. Drew, circa 1859 
 George Hartford Hunt, circa 1888 
 Frank N. Coulson, circa 1920 
 Michael J. McCarthy, circa 1951 
 Robert W. Gillette, circa 1975 
 David F. DeCoste, 2015-current

See also
 List of Massachusetts House of Representatives elections
 Other Plymouth County districts of the Massachusetts House of Representatives: 1st, 2nd, 3rd, 4th, 6th, 7th, 8th, 9th, 10th, 11th, 12th
 List of Massachusetts General Courts
 List of former districts of the Massachusetts House of Representatives

Images
Portraits of legislators

References

External links
 Ballotpedia
  (State House district information based on U.S. Census Bureau's American Community Survey).

House
Government of Plymouth County, Massachusetts